Polyrhaphis pilosa is a species of beetle in the family Cerambycidae. It was described by Lane in 1965. It is known from Bolivia, Ecuador, Guyana, French Guiana, Peru and Suriname.

References

Polyrhaphidini
Beetles described in 1965